Mark Proctor (born 30 January 1961 in Middlesbrough) is an English football player and coach.

Playing career
Proctor began his career with Middlesbrough, making his debut in 1978. He joined Nottingham Forest in 1981 for £440,000 before moving on to Sunderland in 1983. He remained with Sunderland for four years before moving to Sheffield Wednesday in 1987 for £275,000. After two years in Sheffield he returned to Middlesbrough in 1989 for £300,000. He had further spells with Tranmere Rovers, South Shields and Hartlepool United before retiring in 1998.

Managerial career
Proctor helped coach Middlesbrough's Academy to the FA Youth Cup in 2004, before becoming their reserve team manager. He then became assistant manager at Darlington and coach at Hibernian. He was manager of Hibernian on a temporary basis for two matches between the departure of Tony Mowbray and the appointment of John Collins. Under his tenure Hibs defeated Dunfermline Athletic 4–0 and lost 2–1 to Aberdeen.

After leaving Hibs in the spring of 2007, Proctor was appointed manager of Livingston on 23 May. He managed the club during the 2007–08 season, but was sacked on 3 June 2008. Proctor rejoined Middlesbrough in September 2008, as under-18 coach. Proctor was promoted to first team coach by Tony Mowbray. After Mowbray was sacked by Middlesbrough in November 2013, Proctor also left the club. He is now retired from football.

Honours
Full Members Cup: Runner up 1989/90 with Middlesbrough

References

External links

1961 births
Living people
English footballers
England under-21 international footballers
English football managers
Premier League players
Middlesbrough F.C. players
Nottingham Forest F.C. players
Sunderland A.F.C. players
Sheffield Wednesday F.C. players
Tranmere Rovers F.C. players
South Shields F.C. (1974) players
Hartlepool United F.C. players
St Johnstone F.C. players
Middlesbrough F.C. non-playing staff
Hibernian F.C. non-playing staff
Livingston F.C. managers
Scottish Football League managers
Association football midfielders
Footballers from Middlesbrough